Mary Stella Jerram  (born 1945) is a former State Coroner of New South Wales. Jerram was made a Member of the Order of Australia (AM) in the Honorary Division in the 2018 Australia Day Honours: "For significant service to the law in New South Wales as State Coroner, and as a role model for women in the legal profession."

Early life and education
Born and raised in Dunedin, New Zealand in 1945 to a "fairly conservative middle-class family", Jerram attended St. Hilda's Collegiate School in Dunedin, New Zealand, and the University of Otago, where she graduated with a Bachelor of Arts with a major in Languages. Following her graduation, she was gainfully employed as a high school teacher of English and modern languages in Sydney, having moved there in 1969 with her husband and two young children.

Regarding her career as a teacher, Jerram ; states that, "at the same time, I think I never really saw myself as teaching for the rest of my life" and with a previous history of advocacy, she soon thereafter commenced law studies.

Career

Early legal career
Following her completion of law studies, Jerram worked as a legal officer at the New South Wales Independent Teachers' Union from 1980 to 1987 and as a criminal duty solicitor and senior advocate at the New South Wales Legal Aid Commission from 1987 to 1994, up until her secondment to an industrial inquiry into prisoners and prison officers.

Magisterial appointment
In 1994, Jerram was appointed as a Magistrate; after one general year and one as a specialist Children's Magistrate of New South Wales, she undertook the Goulburn country circuit for the next two-and-a-half years.

In 2000, Jerram became the Deputy Chief Magistrate of the Local Court of New South Wales. In this capacity and role, Jerram provided advice regarding legislative and other proposals of assistance to the New South Wales Government and also education for other magistrates.

Early retirement
At the end of 2001, Jerram took an early retirement to live on a  farm in her homeland of New Zealand. For the following five years, she had a commission as Acting Magistrate and came from New Zealand about five times a year for a fortnight to act as a locum, mainly at the Downing Centre in Sydney, Australia.

Magisterial reappointment
After 5 years of retirement, Jerram "missed the law and […] Australia" and moved back to Australia.

In October 2006, she was re-appointed as a full-time New South Wales magistrate.

Coronial appointment
Jerram was appointed by New South Wales Government Attorney-General John Hatzistergos, with the announcement made on 3 May 2007, and succeeded John Abernethy as the State Coroner of NSW.

Commencing her (initially) 5-year contract and her tenure as State Coroner of New South Wales on 7 May 2007, Jerram became the first female State Coroner of New South Wales and was assisted by the Deputy State Coroner, His Honour Magistrate Paul A. MacMahon. Jerram retired in November 2013.

Personal life
Jerram was married to Ian Cameron, with whom she had joined the Australian Labor Party in October 1975. Jerram left the ALP around 1987.

Jerram relocated to the Sydney suburb of Beecroft in 1969 with Cameron and her two children. She moved to Balmain a few months before joining the ALP.

References

Australian coroners
Australian magistrates
Australian women judges
Australian schoolteachers
Australian solicitors
Living people
New Zealand emigrants to Australia
20th-century Australian lawyers
New Zealand schoolteachers
University of Otago alumni
People educated at St Hilda's Collegiate School
1945 births
21st-century Australian judges
21st-century women judges